"Song To Self" is the third and final single from Indie band Travis' sixth studio album, Ode to J. Smith, released on 5 January 2009.

Background
An extended version of Song To Self, which features a middle 8 and an additional chorus, is included on the 7" vinyl pressing. The music video for the song depicts singer Fran Healy emphasising the theme of loneliness in the lyrics of the song. The video received heavy airplay in Mexico, especially on VH1 Latin America.

Track listing
 CD Single
 "Song To Self" - 3:46
 "Tail Of The Tiger" - 2:46

 7" Vinyl
 "Song To Self" (Extended Version) - 4:44
 "Ballad Of J. Smith" - 3:02

Charts

References 

2009 singles
Songs about loneliness
Travis (band) songs
Songs written by Fran Healy (musician)